Ghosts of Afghanistan is a Canadian documentary film, directed by Julian Sher and released in 2021. The film documents the return of Canadian journalist Graeme Smith to Afghanistan, several years after his stint covering the War in Afghanistan for The Globe and Mail, and his interviews with various people about the effects of the war on Afghan society.

The film premiered September 8, 2021 on TVOntario, although it also had selected film festival screenings including at the Human Rights Film Festival in Berlin.

Awards

References

External links
 

2021 films
2021 documentary films
Canadian documentary films
Donald Brittain Award winning shows
Documentary films about the War in Afghanistan (2001–2021)
2020s English-language films
2020s Canadian films